Zaheer-ul-Islam HI (M), is a retired Lieutenant-General who served as the 20th Director General of the ISI. He was appointed to the position on 9 March 2012 and began working a day after his predecessor Ahmed Shuja Pasha left on 18 March 2012. At the time of his appointment, he was serving as the Corps Commander V Corps. In 2012 Forbes named him as the world's 52nd most powerful person.

Family 
His father retired as a brigadier in the Pakistan Army, while his three brothers and his brother-in-law Major Ejaz Aziz also retired as military officers.

His uncle was Shah Nawaz Khan, a major general in the Indian National Army of Subhas Chandra Bose.

In 2012, it was alleged that Islam is related to Shah Rukh Khan. The Pakistan Army denied the allegations and said since Lateef Fatima (Mother of Shah Rukh Khan) is the adopted daughter of Shah Nawaz Khan, Lateef and her son bare no blood relation to Islam.

Military career
Zaheerul Islam was commissioned in the Punjab Regiment in the 55th PMA Long Course on 16 April 1977. He served as Corps Commander of the V Corps.

Zaheer served as the Director-General of the Counter-Terrorism Wing of the ISI before he was promoted to a lieutenant general and moved to Karachi as the Commander of the V Corps. He was the GOC of the 12th Division for some time before coming to the ISI. He also served as Chief of Staff Army Strategic Forces Command from 2004 to 2006.

Controversy
In 2020, the former Prime Minister of Pakistan Nawaz Sharif accused Zaheer-ul-Islam of seeking his resignation during the 2014 Azadi march. Islam denied the allegations.

References

Living people
Pakistani generals
Punjab Regiment officers
Directors General of Inter-Services Intelligence
1956 births
Lieutenant generals
Pakistan Army personnel
Recipients of Hilal-i-Imtiaz
Pakistan Military Academy alumni
Pakistan Army officers
National Defence University, Pakistan alumni
Pakistani Muslims